The 1910 Arizona football team was an American football team that represented the University of Arizona as an independent during the 1910 college football season. In its first season under head coach George F. Shipp, the team compiled a 5–0 record, shut our three of five opponents, and outscored all opponents by a total of 87 to 12. The team captain was Charles John Roletti.

Schedule

References

Arizona
Arizona Wildcats football seasons
College football undefeated seasons
Arizona football